Correspondences is a 1967 musical composition by Milton Babbitt for string orchestra and synthesized tape.   It was first performed at Carnegie Hall on 11 September 1968 by the Buffalo Philharmonic Orchestra with Lukas Foss conducting. It was recorded by the Chicago Symphony Orchestra, conducted by James Levine, in 1994 and released on a CD also featuring works by Elliott Carter, Gunther Schuller, and John Cage.

References

Compositions by Milton Babbitt
1967 compositions
20th-century classical music
Compositions for string orchestra
Electronic compositions